The Moga Municipal Corporation is a nagar nigam (municipal corporation) which administers the city of Moga, Punjab. It has 50 members elected with a first-past-the-post voting system and 1 ex-officio members which is MLA for Moga Assembly Constituency. The corporation was founded 2011, and the first elections were held in 2015.

Mayor
The Mayor of Moga is the elected chief of the Municipal Corporation of Moga. The mayor is the first citizen of the city. The role is largely ceremonial as the real powers are vested in the Municipal Commissioner. The mayor plays a decorative role of representing and upholding the dignity of the city and a functional role in deliberating over the discussions in the corporation.

Deputy Mayors
Senior Deputy Mayor

Junior Deputy Mayor

Elections

References 

Municipal corporations in Punjab, India